Bengal Brigade  is a 1954 American adventure war film directed by Laslo Benedek and starring Rock Hudson, Arlene Dahl and Ursula Thiess. The film was produced and distributed by Universal Pictures, based on the 1952 novel Bengal Tigers by Hall Hunter. It was released in Britain as Bengal Rifles.

Plot
Set in British India in 1857, at the outbreak of the Indian Mutiny. A British officer, Captain Claybourne (Rock Hudson), is cashiered from his regiment over a charge of disobeying orders, but finds that his duty to his men is far from over. He loves his Colonel's daughter (Arlene Dahl) and redeems himself in fighting renegade Sepoys.

Cast

 Rock Hudson as Capt. Jeffrey Claybourne
 Arlene Dahl as Vivian Morrow
 Ursula Thiess as Latah
 Torin Thatcher as Col. Morrow
 Arnold Moss as Rajah Karam
 Dan O'Herlihy as Capt. Ronald Blaine 
 Harold Gordon as Hari Lal
 Michael Ansara as Sgt. Maj. Furan Singh
 Leonard Strong as Mahindra
 Shepard Menken as Bulbir
 Sujata Rubener as Indian Dancer 
 Asoka Rubener as Indian Dancer 
 Jack Raine as 	Col. Rivers
 Ramsay Hill as Maj. Jennings
 Leslie Denison as 	Capt. Ian McLeod
 John Dodsworth as 	Capt. Guy FitzMorell
 Paul Marion as Hardev 
 Charles Wagenheim as Headman
 Robert Bice as Native Sergeant
 Hy Anzell as 	Sepoy 
 Mel Welles as 	Merchant
 Frank Lackteen as 	Merchant

References

Bibliography
 Bego, Mark. Rock Hudson: Public and Private : an Unauthorized Biography. New American Library, 1986.
 Goble, Alan. The Complete Index to Literary Sources in Film. Walter de Gruyter, 1999.
 Richards, Jeffrey. Visions of Yesterday. Routledge & Kegan Paul, 1973.

External links 

1954 films
American historical films
British Empire war films
Universal Pictures films
Films directed by László Benedek
1950s action films
1950s historical films
Films set in the British Raj
Films set in the 1850s
Films about the Indian Rebellion of 1857
War adventure films
1950s English-language films
1950s American films